A rope bed is a type of platform bed in which the sleeper (and mattress) is supported by a lattice of rope, rather than wooden slats. 

In cold climates, a rope bed would be topped with one or more insulating pailasses or bedticks, which would traditionally be stuffed with straw, chaff, or down feathers. It might also have a canopy hung with warm curtains. Modernly, they may be topped by a thin futon (a form of bedtick) or other roll-up mattress (see mattress topper).

In the sixteenth century (England?), bedmats of woven or plaited rush were often laid on the widely-spaced ropes, and the bedticks were laid on the mats. This stopped them from bulging between the ropes. 

Rope beds need to be tightened regularly (with a bed wrench, and sometimes with wedges) as they sag. They must also be re-strung occasionally; re-stringing reduces sag and evens out wear. When fully or partly unstrung, rope beds can be packed flat for transport. The need to tighten bedcords has been said to be the origin of the English phrase "sleep tight",  but some etymologists disagree.

See also

Charpai (warm-climate version)
Bedtick
Platform bed
Murphy bed; some are rope (or wire) beds

References

Beds
Portable furniture